Josef Prokeš (25 February 1933 – 25 August 2016) was a Czech cross-country skier. He competed in the men's 15 kilometre event at the 1956 Winter Olympics.

References

1933 births
2016 deaths
Czech male cross-country skiers
Olympic cross-country skiers of Czechoslovakia
Cross-country skiers at the 1956 Winter Olympics
Place of birth missing